Yorkshire County, Massachusetts was a county in what is now the U.S. state of Maine.  It was established in 1652 to include the area of the proprietary province of Lygonia when the Massachusetts Bay Colony first asserted territorial claims over the settlements in the southern parts of the Province of Maine, extending from the Piscataqua River to just east of the mouth of the Presumpscot River in Casco Bay.  The county eventually grew to encompass effectively all of present-day State of Maine, although the interior was claimed by various Abenaki peoples, and the territory east of Penobscot Bay was claimed (and partly occupied) as part of French Acadia. Massachusetts Bay Colony renamed Yorkshire County, Massachusetts to York County, Massachusetts in 1668. However, the land was assertedly Cornwall County, Province of New York from September 5, 1665, until 1692 when it was turned over to the Dominion of New England. By 1760 most of the Abenaki had either been wiped out or retreated northward toward the Saint Lawrence River, and New France had been conquered in the French and Indian War.

The large size of the county led to its division in 1760, with Cumberland and Lincoln counties carved out of its eastern portions.  When the 1780 Constitution of Massachusetts was adopted, the state created the District of Maine to manage its eastern territories. In 1805 the northern portion of York County was separated to form part of Oxford County.  When Maine achieved statehood in 1820 all of the counties of the District of Maine became counties of Maine.

References

History of York County, Maine

Cumberland County, Maine
Former counties of the United States
Former counties of Massachusetts
Defunct administrative divisions in Massachusetts
Former regions and territories of the United States
Lincoln County, Maine
York County, Maine
Pre-statehood history of Maine
Exclaves in the United States
Former exclaves